Anisopodus strigosus is a species of beetle in the family Cerambycidae that was described by Wilhelm Ferdinand Erichson in 1847.

References

Anisopodus
Beetles described in 1847